The 2021–22 Philadelphia Flyers season was the 55th season for the National Hockey League franchise that was established on June 5, 1967. On March 29, 2022, the Flyers were eliminated from playoff contention, with a 4–1 loss to the Minnesota Wild. The Flyers missed the playoffs for the second year in a row, marking the first time since 1993–94 that the Flyers missed the playoffs in consecutive seasons.

Standings

Divisional standings

Conference standings

Schedule and results

Regular season 
The Flyers' regular season schedule was released on July 22, 2021.

Player statistics

Skaters

Goaltenders

†Denotes player spent time with another team before joining the Flyers. Stats reflect time with the Flyers only.
‡Denotes player was traded mid-season. Stats reflect time with the Flyers only.
Bold/italics denotes franchise record.

Awards and records

Awards

Records

The Flyers 4–3 loss to the New York Islanders on January 25 featured two records being broken. It was the final loss in a team record 13-game winless streak, breaking the previous record (12) set in 1999. The game also featured defenseman Keith Yandle breaking Doug Jarvis’ 36-year-old NHL record consecutive games played streak. Yandle’s streak continued until he was a healthy scratch on April 2, ending it at 989 games. Yandle’s –47 plus/minus rating on the season is the worst in team history. The team also set a franchise record for fewest powerplay goals scored (30) and tied the mark for fewest shootouts wins (1).

Milestones

Transactions
The Flyers have been involved in the following transactions during the 2021–22 season.

Trades

Notes:
 Philadelphia will receive Florida's 1st-round pick in 2024 if it falls outside the top 10 selections, otherwise Philadelphia will receive Florida's 1st-round pick in 2025.

Players acquired

Players lost

Signings

Draft picks

Below are the Philadelphia Flyers' selections at the 2021 NHL Entry Draft, which were held on July 23 to 24, 2021. It was held virtually via Video conference call from the NHL Network studio in Secaucus, New Jersey.

Notes

References

Philadelphia Flyers seasons
Flyers
2021 in sports in Pennsylvania
2022 in sports in Pennsylvania